The following is a list of squads for each nation competing in 2017 EAFF E-1 Football Championship Final Women in Chiba, Japan. Each nation must submit a squad of 23 players, including 3 goalkeepers.

Age, caps and goals as of the start of the tournament, 8 December 2017.

Head coach:  Sigurður Ragnar Eyjólfsson

Sources:

Head coach:  Asako Takakura

Sources:

Head coach:  Kim Kwang-min

Sources:

Head coach:  Yoon Deok-yeo

Source:

References

EAFF E-1 Football Championship squads (women)